Open English is an online English school.  In 2014, the school had 100,000 students in the Spanish speaking world.

History 
Andrés Moreno, Nicolette Rankin and Wilmer Samiento, co-founded Open English in Caracas, Venezuela in September 2006. In 2009, Rankin and Moreno moved the company to Miami, Florida. Moreno played the English student and Rankin played the English teacher in their homemade commercials for Open English.

From 2010 to 2013, the company raised $120 million in VC funding, including $69 million in 2013 from venture firm Technology Crossover Ventures (TCV).

In 2013, co-founder Rankin left Open English and co-founded another online school, Next University. In 2015, Next University was acquired by Open English.

See also
Language education

References

External links
Open English
Open English Junior

Companies based in Miami-Dade County, Florida
Schools of English as a second or foreign language